An anal plug (or anal tampon) is a medical device sometimes used to treat fecal incontinence by blocking involuntary loss of fecal material.  They vary in design and composition, but are typically single-use  intra-anal disposable devices made out of soft materials for containing fecal material

A 2015 systematic review found that anal plugs may be helpful in alleviating fecal incontinence, provided that they are tolerated and that patients comply with them. 

Although more commonly used in patients with neurological disorders (i.e. meningomyelocele), they can be used for anal incontinence of any cause. Some examples of commercially available anal plugs are: Peristeen produced by Coloplast and a polyvinyl-alcohol plug called A-Tam Analtampons produced by Med SSE-System in Germany. The Peristeen (formerly Conveen) plug is a disposable foam insert that expands when exposed to the warm and moisture of the anal canal. It has a conical tip and a removal cord. The A-Tam Analtampons are similarly made of foam and come in various shapes such as cylindrical, spiral and ball-headed.

References

Gastroenterology
Incontinence
Defecation
Medical devices